Mitja Mörec (born 21 February 1983) is a retired Slovenian football centre back and current manager of Floridsdorfer AC.

Career
In March 2011, Mörec signed a contract with Lyngby BK for the remainder of the 2010–11 season. Following the expiration of his Lyngby contract, Mörec signed for ADO Den Haag in August 2011 on a one-year contract. However, his contract was terminated in January 2012.

In July 2013, Mörec signed for Kazakhstan First Division side Kaisar on a 30-month contract. But after only six-months Mörec moved to Ravan Baku of the Azerbaijan Premier League in January 2014 on an 18-month contract.

Coaching and later career
From the summer 2017 to the summer 2018, Mörec was coaching at a A.C. Milan soccer school in Dubai. On 1 November 2018, Mörec was appointed U-15 manager at Favoritner AC. He also began playing for the clubs first team in the Wiener Stadtliga from 1 January 2019.

On 7 May 2020, Mörec left Favoritner AC to join SV Wienerberg as an assistant coach under manager Andreas Reisinger. In January 2021, Mörec moved on to Floridsdorfer AC, where he was appointed assistant coach to Roman Ellensohn. When Ellensohn was fired on 16 April 2021, Mörec and Aleksandar Gitsov was appointed as an interim manager duo. In June 2021 the club announced, that Mörec would continue as the manager and Gitsov as assistant coach for the 2021–22 season.

Career statistics

See also
Slovenian international players

References

External links
Player profile at NZS 

Mitja Mörec player profile at ÖFB

Hungarian Slovenes
1983 births
Living people
People from Murska Sobota
Slovenian footballers
Slovenian people of Hungarian descent
Association football defenders
Maccabi Herzliya F.C. players
Expatriate footballers in Israel
Israeli Premier League players
First Professional Football League (Bulgaria) players
Eredivisie players
NK Mura players
SK Sturm Graz players
Slovenian PrvaLiga players
PFC CSKA Sofia players
PFC Slavia Sofia players
Panetolikos F.C. players
Lyngby Boldklub players
ADO Den Haag players
ND Mura 05 players
Ravan Baku FC players
Hoang Anh Gia Lai FC players
Favoritner AC players
Slovenian expatriate sportspeople in Bulgaria
Expatriate footballers in Bulgaria
Slovenian expatriate footballers
Slovenian expatriate sportspeople in Israel
Slovenian expatriate sportspeople in Greece
Slovenian expatriate sportspeople in Denmark
Slovenian expatriate sportspeople in the Netherlands
Slovenian expatriate sportspeople in Austria
Slovenian expatriate sportspeople in Azerbaijan
Expatriate footballers in Greece
Expatriate men's footballers in Denmark
Expatriate footballers in the Netherlands
Expatriate footballers in Vietnam
Expatriate footballers in Austria
Expatriate footballers in Azerbaijan
Slovenia youth international footballers
Slovenia under-21 international footballers
Slovenia international footballers
Slovenian football managers
Slovenian expatriate football managers
Expatriate football managers in Austria
Floridsdorfer AC managers